Marrar is a Jat tribe of Pakistan and India. According to the book Glossary of tribes Castes of Punjab and NW Province Marrars were Sombansi Jats. The Punjabi tribe of Marrar is not to be confused with the south Indian tribe Marar.

Marrars are to found in Gujrat District In Pakistan Punjab and in India Punjab.

History

The Marrars in Gujrat say they came into the Punjab from Samana, India in the service of Moghul King Akbar who settled them in the Gujrat District of Punjab. the marrar in Seattle Ahmad nagar ghakkar bara koat mar blaoch the city of marrar

References

Social groups of Pakistan
Ethnic groups in India
Muslim communities of India
 
Punjabi culture